{{Automatic taxobox
| image = Ourapteryx sp1.jpg
| image_caption = Ourapteryx species
| taxon = Ennominae
| authority = (Duponchel, 1845)
| subdivision_ranks = Tribes
| subdivision = 
Abraxini
Angeronini
Apeirini
Apochimini
Azelinini
Baptini
Bistonini (disputed)
Boarmiini
Bupalini (disputed)
Caberini
Campaeini (disputed)
Cheimopteini
Colotoini
Cystidiini
Desertobiini
†Eogeometer (Fischer, Michalski & Hausmann, 2019)
Ennomini
Erannini (disputed)
Gnophini (Duponchel, 1845) (disputed)
Gonodontini (including Odontoperini)
Lithinini (disputed)
Macariini
Melanolophiini (disputed)
Nacophorini (disputed)
Ourapterygini
Phaseliini (disputed)
Sphacelodini
Theriini (disputed)
Wilemanini
and see text
}}

Ennominae is the largest subfamily of the geometer moth family (Geometridae) with some 9,700 described species in 1,100 genera. They are usually a fairly small moths, though some (such as the peppered moth) grow to be considerably large. This subfamily has a global distribution. It includes some species that are notorious defoliating pests. The subfamily was first described by Philogène Auguste Joseph Duponchel in 1845.

The status of several tribes is debated.For example, the Boarmiini are sometimes massively expanded to include the Bistonini, Bupalini, Erannini, Gnophini, Melanolophini, Phaseliini and Theriini. The Nacophorini and perhaps the Campaeini might need to be merged with the Lithinini, and all three might warrant merging into the Ennomini.The group sometimes separated as Cassymini is tentatively included in the Abraxini here. The Alsophilinae, usually treated as a small subfamily in their own right, might simply be a specialized lineage of Boarmiini. 

Selected genera

Tribe Baptini
 LomographaTribe Boarmiini
†Eogeometer (Fischer, Michalski & Hausmann, 2019)
Tribe Bupalini
 BupalusTribe Caberini
 CaberaTribe Campaeini
 CampaeaTribe Colotoini
 ColotoisTribe Erannini
 ErannisTribe Gnophini
 Charissa Gnophos HirasaTribe Gonodontini
 Aethiopodes (sometimes in Odontopera)
 OdontoperaGenera incertae sedis
Numerous genera have hitherto not been definitely assigned to a tribe. These include:

Fossil
In 2019, the first geometrid caterpillar in Baltic amber was discovered by German scientists. It was described as the earliest evidence for the subfamily of Ennominae, particularly the tribe of Boarmiini.

References

External links

 
Moth subfamilies
Insect pests of tropical forests
Insects of West Africa
Moths of Africa